Parasite is a 1982 American science fiction horror film produced and directed by Charles Band. The film is set in a dystopian, post-apocalyptic future in which the United States has been taken over by a criminal organization which unwittingly creates an uncontrollable deadly parasite and sets it loose on the population. The film received negative reviews from film critics, who viewed it as a poorly written B movie with unconvincing special effects. The film features actress Demi Moore in her first major film role.

Plot
In the near future, an atomic disaster has reduced the world to poverty. Instead of a government, America is run by an organization called the Merchants, who exploit the degenerate remains of society. In order to keep control of the populace, the Merchants force Dr. Paul Dean to create a new life form, a parasite that feeds on its host. Realizing the deadly potential of such a being, Dean escapes the Merchants with the parasite, infecting himself in the process.

Now on the run, he travels from town to town, studying the parasite so that he can find a way to destroy it, all the while keeping one step ahead of a Merchant named Wolf, who is hunting for him. While resting in a desert town, he is attacked by a gang of hooligans-Dana, Arn, Shell, Bo, and Zeke, led by Ricus, former slave of the Merchants. The gang steal a silver canister containing the parasite, not realizing what it is. It escapes and infects one of the members.

Meanwhile, Paul befriends a pretty young lemon grower named Patricia Welles, who promises to help him destroy the escaped parasite. Ricus, trying to save the life of his friend, comes to Paul for help, only to be confronted by Wolf. Patricia, Paul, and Ricus evade Wolf, but when they return, the parasite has spread to another member and grown into a fleshy worm with a mouthful of deadly teeth. Ricus becomes a turncoat and attempts to help, but is killed by Wolf. A friendly diner owner, named Collins, comes to aid the group. After Patricia helps kill the parasite bonded to Paul by electrocuting it, the remaining parasite attacks Wolf who is then blown up by Patricia, Paul, and Collins.

Cast
 Robert Glaudini as Dr. Paul Dean
 Demi Moore as Patricia Welles
 Luca Bercovici as Ricus
 James Davidson as Wolf the Merchant
 Al Fann as Collins
 Cherie Currie as Dana
 Tom Villard as Zeke
 Vivian Blaine as Miss Daley
 Freddy Moore as Arn
 Cheryl Smith as Captive Girl
 Joanelle Romero as Bo

Home media 
The film was released on CED 1983 by Embassy Home Entertainment, with a VHS from Wizard Video around the same time. A DVD edition was released by Cult Video on July 6, 1999. Anchor Bay later re-released the film on August 6, 2002, and again on September 13, 2005, the latter was released as a six-disk combo pack. A 3D Blu-ray disc was released in the US by Kino Lorber on October 22, 2019.

Reception
On Rotten Tomatoes the film has an approval rating of 15% based on reviews from 13 critics, with an average rating of 3.3/10.

Variety magazine, in their review, called the film "lethargic between its terror scenes, making it a test of patience for all but the most fanatical of horror cheapies." In a similarly negative review, Time Out magazine called the script "banal" and the actors "uninspired," as well as calling the film "visually as uninteresting as a catfood commercial." Janet Maslin from The New York Times wrote, "The movie winds up more gruesome than scary, especially because the 3-D tricks are both repetitive and infrequent. It provides only a few strong shocks, chief among them an Alien-inspired scene that has the creature bursting forth from the body of one victim. These thrills notwithstanding, this is a badly acted B movie without much flair for involving its audience."

J. Doyle Wallis from DVD Talk gave the film 2/5 stars, stating that the film was "just for the nostalgic 80's horror film fan, and loony Demi Moore/Stan Winston stalkers". Scott Weinberg from eFilmCritic awarded the film 1 out of 5 stars, calling it "[an] Amazingly BORING sci-fi horror". TV Guide rated the film an abysmal 0 out of 5 stars, stating that the film was "[a] crushingly inane mess".

In 2019, during an appearance on The Late Late Show with James Corden, Moore named Parasite as "the worst movie [she had] ever been in".

See also
 Parasitism

References

External links
 
 
 

1982 films
1982 horror films
1980s science fiction horror films
American body horror films
American monster movies
American science fiction horror films
1982 3D films
Embassy Pictures films
Fictional parasites and parasitoids
American 3D films
Films directed by Charles Band
Puppet films
Films scored by Richard Band
American post-apocalyptic films
Films set in the 1990s
Films set in the future
1980s monster movies
1980s English-language films
1980s American films